Treponema carateum is a species of spirochete bacteria in the genus Treponema.

It is the cause of pinta, a disease affecting exclusively the skin. Children living in tropical American countries are most at risk.

References

carateum
Undescribed species